Maritsa 3 Thermal Power Plant is a power plant situated near the city of Dimitrovgrad, southern Bulgaria. It has an installed capacity of 120 MW.

See also

 Energy in Bulgaria

External links
Maritsa 3 TPP

Coal-fired power stations in Bulgaria
Buildings and structures in Haskovo Province
Dimitrovgrad, Bulgaria